Hillsborough County Sheriff's Office (HCSO) is the primary law enforcement agency for Hillsborough County, Florida and is responsible for law enforcement services for the  of unincorporated areas of the county as well as operation of the two jail facilities and a work release center, and provides courthouse security for the 13th Judicial Circuit. Each of the three incorporated cities (Tampa, Plant City, and Temple Terrace) has its own police agency. Tampa International Airport and the University of South Florida also have independent police agencies.

The sheriff is the chief law enforcement officer of the county.  The current sheriff is Chad Chronister. Sheriff Chronister was appointed by Florida Governor Rick Scott on September 30, 2017, to fill the position after the retirement of David Gee.

The office has one of the lowest officer-to-citizen ratios in the state with 1.4 deputies per 1000 citizens. The national average is 2.3 per 1000. The population of Hillsborough County in 2006 was 1,157,738.

History
The HCSO was formed in 1845.

In 1986, the Commission on Accreditation for Law Enforcement Agencies (CALEA) accredited the Hillsborough County Sheriff's Office.   The Hillsborough County Sheriff's Office was the first sheriff's office in Florida to be nationally accredited and the 1st in the nation to be re-accredited.

Uniforms
Deputies wear dark green trousers with a black stripe on the sides.  The shirt is a white poly-cotton button-down with chest pockets, epaulettes, and shoulder patches.  Deputies wear silver 5-point star badges. Officers above the rank of corporal wear gold badges. A black tie is worn with the dress uniform (long sleeves) and the command staff wear black dress jackets. Black shoes or boots are also worn with the uniform.  Hats are typically not worn by deputies but they are plain black straw cowboy type.

Deputies
Law enforcement deputies must be at least 21 years old and have an associate degree; a combination of high school diploma/ GED and 3 years active duty military; or high school diploma/ GED and 3 years of continuous full-time employment with the same employer. Law enforcement deputies are responsible for responding to calls for service and enforcing laws.

Detention deputies must be 19 years old and have possession of a high school diploma or a GED Certificate. They are responsible for the supervision of inmates in the county jails. They also transport inmates to and from court, prison and other counties. Detention deputies are also in charge of protection of the county courthouse and its judges.

Starting salary for a deputy trainee is 41,017.60. Starting salary for a certified law enforcement officer or detention deputy is 51,717.12.

Demographics 
The Hillsborough County Sheriff's Office has approximately 2,067 deputies. Law Enforcement is made up of approximately 1,254 deputies, and Detention is made up of approximately 813 deputies.

As of 2020, law enforcement was 71.4% white, 8.5% black, 15.6% Hispanic, 1.4% Asian, 0.9% native and 2.3% other. Detention was 56.3% white, 18.9% black, 21.6% Hispanic, 1.7% Asian, 0.5% native and 0.9% other.

Overall racial demographics in 2020 for all deputies was 65.5% white, 12.6% black, 17.9% Hispanic, 1.5% Asian, 0.7% native and 1.7% other.

Law Enforcement has 207 females, and detention has 150 females.

Rank structure

Patrol services
The Department of Patrol Services consists of five district offices serving different geographical areas of unincorporated Hillsborough County. Patrol services are overseen by a Colonel. Each District is commanded by a Major. Patrol squads consist of a Sergeant, Corporal and Deputies. Two squads patrol each district and are overseen by a Lieutenant.

Each district is assigned traffic enforcement squads, detectives, and street level crimes squads. In 2018, the Sheriff's Office implemented a DUI squad which operate on a county wide level.

District I is responsible for northern Hillsborough, District II for eastern Hillsborough, District III for western Hillsborough, District IV for southern Hillsborough and District V for central Hillsborough. Patrol service the following unincorporated census-designated places.

Reserve II Program

The Reserve II Deputy Program is a uniformed Sheriff's Office support organization open to all persons age 21 and older, on an equal-opportunity basis.  Reserve II deputies work with regular deputies in various assignments.  The Hillsborough County Sheriff's Office takes great pride in the reserve II deputies civic spirit and willingness to serve.

The Reserve Program currently consists of over 110 volunteers.  Each reserve II deputy must serve a minimum of 20 volunteer hours each month on assigned duties.

Communications Bureau
The Hillsborough County Sheriff's Office Communications Bureau is the first point-of-contact for citizens living in unincorporated areas of the county that are seeking emergency or law enforcement services. This is one of the busiest Public Safety Answering Points (9-1-1) in the Tampa Bay area. In a typical year, the Bureau staff answers approximately 1.6 million telephone calls from the public and other agencies, of which approximately 540,000 are received via 911. The Communications Bureau entered approximately 750,000 calls into the CAD system.. The Communications Bureau is the largest component of non-law enforcement officers in the Sheriff's Office; it is composed of over 140 personnel, who work 24 hours a day, 365 days a year.

In July 2004, the  facility was completely remodeled with state-of-the-art ergonomic workstations and new computers with flat panel LCD monitors. A new Versaterm/Versadex Computer Aided Dispatch (CAD) and Records Management System (RMS) was installed in February 2005. This new systems have significantly expanded the capabilities of both the dispatcher and patrol deputy by allowing them to rapidly share information, efficiently coordinate resources using full-color dynamic displays, and improve officer safety.  In addition to the new CAD system, the Bureau utilizes the Plant Vesta E9-1-1 (enhanced 9-1-1) phone system. The E9-1-1 system automatically displays a map that shows the location of each call.

Detention services
The Department of Detention Services is composed of two major facilities and a work release center.

Orient Road Jail
The Orient Road Jail has three command areas within the  facility with a rated capacity of 1,711. North and South Commands are under the direction of one Lieutenant and consists of primarily six housing units. Each direct supervision housing unit contains four pods that are designed to house 72 inmates.  Another Lieutenant oversees Central Command, which is the receiving area for new admissions and includes Intake Housing and the Central Breath Testing Unit. The Orient Road Jail processes all arrested individuals in Hillsborough County regardless of the arresting agency. Approximately 74,000 people per year are processed through the booking section. Each inmate completes property intake, medical screening, fingerprinting, photographing, and classification interview during the booking process.

Falkenburg Road Jail
The Falkenburg Road Jail opened in 1998 with 768 beds. An expansion of the facility in 2003 added 1,536 more beds to its present rated capacity of 2,304. Falkenburg's dormitories are constructed of pre-cast concrete tilt-up walls. Deputies manage 72 inmates in a direct supervision environment. The daily operational cost is $74.04 per inmate. The Falkenburg Road Jail uses video court and video visitation. Prisoners and visitors are not permitted to talk directly to each other.

Work Release Center
Directly across from the Orient Road Jail, the Work Release Center houses reduced-custody inmates. These inmates may either work at an outside job every day, returning to the facility at the end of the day or they can work as a trustee in various areas of the Sheriff's Office. Trustee labor includes maintaining the facility grounds, food preparation, washing county cars, and sanitation. In 2006, the county saved an estimated $13 million by using trustee labor. The House Arrest Program is for individuals who are court ordered to remain in their homes during non-working hours. They wear an electronic anklet and are subject to random visits by the house arrest deputy. These individuals must meet strict guidelines and undergo extensive background checks before being placed into the program. Day Reporting is a program usually dealing with people who have been sentences for minor offenses. This program requires the individual to check in each day with a community service officer allowing better tracking and ensuring that these individuals appear for scheduled court dates.

School security
HCSO deputies  provide security at Hillsborough County Public Schools.  In accordance with Florida law, at least one deputy is stationed at every public middle and high school in Hillsborough County.  These deputies are known as school resource officers (SRO's) and work to become familiar with the students at their school.

1967 riots
In 1967 a black burglary suspect was shot and killed by a white policeman.  Long simmering rage ignited the city that was fueled by other problems.  Within hours, storefronts were ablaze, and teenagers pelted police cruisers with rocks and bottles.  Snipers held police and firefighters at bay.  Fearing the violence would turn into another riot situation similar to that of Watts, California, Sheriff Beard asked Governor Claude Kirk to call out the National Guard.  The guardsmen exchanged gunfire with rioters but never attacked.  Beard was convinced by black leaders to allow groups of their own to quell the rioters, and within two days, Beard declared the riots were over.

Misconduct

In 2006, sheriff's deputies, along with other law enforcement agencies arrested 52 members of the Caribbean American Club on racketeering charges. Two years later, the court threw out 23 of the cases on the grounds of entrapment. In 2013, the department agreed to pay $260,000 to ten of those arrested as compensation.

In 2007, Deputy Roosevelt Givens began a sexual relationship with a 13-year-old girl. In 2012 the deputy was allowed to resign. The victim,  refused to cooperate with the investigation making prosecution difficult.

On 29 January 2008 Quadriplegic Brian Sterner was dumped from his wheelchair as he was being booked for an alleged traffic violation at the Hillsborough County, Florida Sheriff's Office jail facility. Surveillance video showed Sterner tumbling to the floor and officers searching his clothing as he lay prone. The deputy later resigned and was charged with felony abuse on a disabled person after the video was publicized. Charges were dropped when she agreed to a plea deal which she agrees to never work in law enforcement again and does 100 hours of community service with the disabled. Several other deputies were suspended without pay and one supervisor was fired for not reporting the incident.

On 11 September 2008, a mentally ill man was hog-tied by three sheriff's deputies and subjected to a number of electrical shocks. The local medical examiner said that Roney Wilson died as a result of "delirium with agitation due to schizoaffective disorder." The death was the subject of a civil lawsuit.

In 2008, sheriff's deputies and officers from the Temple Terrace Police Department lied on official documents regarding a routine arrest for driving under the influence. Deputy James Glover falsely attested the correct procedures had been followed. When the defense attorney asked for the video of the incident, he discovered the tapes had been altered by officials.

Sheriffs

 1845-1847 John Parker
 1847-1849 John I. Hooker
 1850-1854 B.J. Hagler
 1854-1855 E.T. Kendrick
 1855-1857 Henry Parker
 1857-1858 Dr. William A. Lively
 1858-1865 William S. Spencer
 1865-1867 John T. Lesley
 1874-1875 I.R. Hay
 1877-1885 D. Isaac Craft
 1885-1893 James P. Martin
 1893-1901 Thomas K. Spencer
 1901-1905 Robert Woodburn
 1912-1913 Robert Jackson
 1913-1917 William C. Spencer 
 1917-1921 Alonzo J. White
 1921-1925 William C. Spencer
 1925-1929 Luther M. Hiers
 1929-1929 Luther Hatton
 1929-1933 R.T. Joughin
 1933-1935 William C. Spencer
 1935-1941 Jerry McLeod
 1941-1952 Hugh Culbreath
 1952-1953 Elbert Moore
 1953-1965 Ed Blackburn
 1965-1978 Malcolm Beard
 1978-1992 Walter C. Heinrich
 1992-2004 Cal Henderson
 2004–2017 David Gee
 2017–Present Chad Chronister

Line of duty deaths
17 Hillsborough County Sheriff's Office deputies died while they were actively employed by the sheriff's office. Here is a list of those deputies.

See also

County sheriff (Florida)
List of United States state and local law enforcement agencies

References

External links

Hillsborough County, Florida
Sheriffs' departments of Florida
1845 establishments in Florida